Kringlan is a shopping mall located in the Icelandic capital region. It is the second largest in the country, after Smáralind in Kópavogur, with over 180 shops and restaurants. It was constructed in 1987, and includes a Hagkaup supermarket, a library, a theatre, a cinema, as well as a selection of well-known restaurants and retailers. 

Kringlan lies on the busiest traffic intersection in Reykjavík. Icelandic state television RÚV’s headquarters are also nearby. Reykjavík City Theatre lies adjacent to the shopping centre.

Kringlan has some department stores which are H&M, Hagkaup, Next, 66North and Bónus.

It was featured in the film Dreamland (2010).

Name
The name is derived from the Kringla marsh or Kringlumýri . A literal translation into English could either be 'circle' or 'pretzel', though the mall is neither circular nor has it anything to do with pretzels.

See also
Reykjavík
Smáralind

References

External links
 

Shopping malls in Reykjavík
Shopping malls established in 1987